Miguel Soares Martins (born 4 November 1997) is a Portuguese handball player for SC Pick Szeged and the Portuguese national team.

He represented Portugal at the 2020 European Men's Handball Championship.

Honours
Porto
Portuguese League: 2013–14, 2014–15, 2018–19, 2020–21
Portuguese Cup: 2018–19, 2020–21
Portuguese Super Cup: 2014, 2019

References

External links

1997 births
Living people
Portuguese male handball players
Sportspeople from Porto
FC Porto handball players
Handball players at the 2020 Summer Olympics